is a Filipino-born Japanese actress and singer. She was a member of Japanese idol girl group AKB48 and its spin-off unit Diva.

As an actress, Akimoto has appeared in both Japanese and American productions, and made her Hollywood debut in Sniper: Assassin's End (2020). She also provides the Japanese dub for Mantis in the Marvel Cinematic Universe.

Biography

Early career 
Akimoto was born to a Japanese father and a Filipino mother. In 2012, she ran the Tokyo Marathon for the second year in a row and donated the money to the Philippines. Her solo book of photographs is entitled Ari no Mama. On June 26, 2014, Akimoto was appointed as the Goodwill Philippine Tourism Ambassador in order to promote the Philippines as a tourist destination in Japan. She was also assigned as a narrator in the collaboration drama of PTV-4 and Nippon TV entitled "Halo Halo House-Jose's Nippon Diary"

2006–2013: AKB48 member 

Akimoto began her career in AKB48 as one of the members of the second generation, the Original Team K. On the last day of the Budokan concert on August 23, 2009, during the first team shuffle, Akimoto was officially made captain of Team K. She resigned after a scandal in 2010 but after completing the Tokyo Marathon in 2011, she was reappointed the position. On August 24, 2012, in the Tokyo Dome~1830m no Yume~ concert, Yuko Oshima replaced her as the captain of Team K via team shuffle.

She has since been involved with sub-unit group Diva under Avex. She became a regular on the popular noon TV show Waratte Iitomo from 2010 to 2012. She was also featured as one of the members in AKB48's own anime television show alongside other members Minami Takahashi, Yuko Oshima, Tomomi Itano, Atsuko Maeda and others.

On April 7, 2013, Akimoto announced on her official blog that she would not be participating in AKB48's 2013 general election, and would be graduating from AKB48 to focus on her acting. Her graduation ceremony was held on August 22 at the Tokyo Dome, and her final stage performance was held on August 28 at the AKB48 Theater, and has been streamed live by Nico Nico Namahousou.

2014–present: Solo career 
In 2014, she reunited with her sub-unit group DIVA to release their final single "Discovery", an album, and a tour before disbandment.

She composed and sang "Little Witch" which was the NHK 2014 Spring Campaign Theme Song.

Since leaving AKB48 she has starred in four movies. She has a recurring role as Bikuu in Garo which led to a solo movie spin off in 2015. She sang the theme song of the movie entitled "Sengetsu ~Hikari to Yami no Soba de~".

Akimoto was a co-host for Team Japan in the reality competition show Ultimate Beastmaster which was released on Netflix on February 24, 2017.

Discography

With AKB48

Singles

Singles with SKE48

Stage units 
Team K 1st Stage 
 
 

Team K 2nd Stage 
 Blue Rose
 
Team K 3rd Stage 
 
Himawari Gumi 1st Stage 
 
Himawari Gumi 2nd Stage 
 Confession
Team K 4th Stage 
 
Team K 5th Stage 
  (Solo Unit)
Team K 6th Stage "Reset"
 
Team K Waiting Stage

With Diva 

 "Tsuki no Ura gawa"
 "Fade out"
 "Information"
 "Blue rose -Diva ver.-"
 "Cry"
 "No way out"
 "Chika Suidō"
 "Maria -Diva ver.-"
 "Lost the Way"
 "Kanashimi no Mirage"
 "Kimi wa Pegasus -Diva ver.-"

Filmography

Movies

Television dramas

Stage plays

Musicals

Other television

Japanese dub

References

External links 

  
 Official agency profile  
 Sayaka Yamamoto at Oricon 
 

1988 births
Living people
Actresses from Manila
AKB48 members
Filipino people of Japanese descent
Japanese actresses
Japanese expatriates in the Philippines
Japanese idols
Japanese people of Filipino descent
Musicians from Chiba Prefecture
People from Makati
People from Matsudo
Singers from Makati
21st-century Japanese singers
21st-century Japanese women singers